Moba or Moba–Bimoba is a major language of the Moba people of Togo and Ghana. However, in Ghana only 60% of ethnic Bimoba speak the language. There are also about 2,000 Moba speakers in Burkina Faso. It has two dialects (Moba In Togo and Burkina Faso and Bimoba in Ghana). The language cluster is also known as Moba–Bimoba.

Classification
Moba is spoken by the Moba people, a subgroup of the Gurma people. Moba is part of the Gurma subgroup of the Gur languages. It is related to the Konkomba language of the Konkomba people.

Writing system

See also
Bimoba people

References

Moba dictionary : https://www.webonary.org/moba

Languages of Togo
Gurma languages
Languages of Ghana